This Is This! is the fourteenth and final studio album by Weather Report, released in June 1986.  The band thought that it had fulfilled its contract with Columbia Records through the release of the previous album, Sportin' Life.  This, however, was not the case, and the band had to release one more record.

Track listing
All tracks are written by Joe Zawinul, except where noted.

 "This Is This" – 7:06
 "Face the Fire" – 2:34
 "I'll Never Forget You" – 7:51
 "Jungle Stuff, Part 1" (Mino Cinélu) – 4:43
 "Man with the Copper Fingers" – 6:12
 "Consequently" (Victor Bailey) – 4:56
 "Update" – 6:08
 "China Blues" – 6:11

Personnel
Weather Report
 Josef Zawinul - keyboards, cover concept
 Wayne Shorter - saxophones
 Victor Bailey - bass
 Mino Cinélu - percussion, vocals
 Peter Erskine - drums
 Omar Hakim - drums on "Consequently"

Additional musicians
 Carlos Santana - guitar on "This Is This" and "Man With the Copper Fingers"
 Marva Barnes - vocals
 Colleen Coil - vocals
 Siedah Garrett - vocals
 Darryl Phinnessee - vocals

Technical
 Howard Siegel, Paul Ericksen - engineer
 Tony Lane, Nancy Donald - cover artwork
 Lou Beach - cover illustration

References

External links 

Weather Report Annotated Discography: This Is This!

1986 albums
Columbia Records albums
Weather Report albums